Kevin Meddings (born 12 October 1941) is a former Australian rules footballer who played with Footscray in the Victorian Football League (VFL).

Meddings spent most of the 1960s playing for Yarraville in the Victorian Football Association but in the 1962 season played at Ted Whitten's Footscray. After getting his clearance, the full-forward made his first and only VFL appearance in a six-point loss to Essendon at Windy Hill. He represented the VFA at the interstate arena, most notably in the 1966 Hobart Carnival.

References

1941 births
Western Bulldogs players
Yarraville Football Club players
Australian rules footballers from Victoria (Australia)
Living people